The year 1671 in science and technology involved some significant events.

Astronomy
 Completion of Paris Observatory, the world's first such national institution.
 February 27 – The Ortenau meteorite lands in Germany.
 October 25 – Italian-born French astronomer Giovanni Domenico Cassini discovers Iapetus, the second known moon of the planet Saturn.

Mathematics
 James Gregory develops a series expansion for the inverse tangent function and discovers Taylor's theorem.
  publishes Kokin-Sanpo-Ki (古今算法之記), in which he gives the first comprehensive applied account of Chinese algebra in Japan.

Medicine
 Publication of Les secrets de la medecine des Chinois, the first Western book on traditional Eastern medicine, in Grenoble.

Physics
 Jacques Rohault publishes Traité de physique in Paris, disseminating Cartesian physics.

Technology
 March 31 – The English Royal Navy launches HMS Royal James at Portsmouth Royal Dockyard, its first warship to have a frame reinforced by iron bars rather than an all wooden ship, an innovation by naval architect Anthony Deane.

Births
 October 1 – Guido Grandi, Italian mathematician (died 1742)

Deaths
 June 25 – Giovanni Battista Riccioli, Italian astronomer (born 1598)

References

 
17th century in science
1670s in science